Bohdan Ihorovych Veklyak (born 31 August 1999) is a Ukrainian professional football who plays as a centre-back for Metalurh Zaporizhzhia.

Career
Veklyak, born in Zhydachiv, is a product of the neighbouring Mykolaiv sportive school and after continued his youth career in the Skala Morshyn youth sportive system.

After playing in the different Ukrainian First League and Ukrainian Premier League Reserves teams, he signed a 2,5 years deal with the Ukrainian Premier League Olimpik Donetsk in January 2021.

References

External links
 
 

1999 births
Living people
People from Zhydachiv
Ukrainian footballers
FC Skala Stryi (2004) players
FC Hirnyk-Sport Horishni Plavni players
FC Karpaty Lviv players
FC Olimpik Donetsk players
FC Mynai players
FC Metalurh Zaporizhzhia players
Ukrainian Premier League players
Ukrainian First League players
Association football defenders